Soldier Creek is a stream in Jackson County, Kansas and Shawnee County, Kansas and Nemaha County, Kansas, in the United States. It is a tributary of the Kansas River.

Soldier Creek was named from its frequent use as a camping site of soldiers passing from Fort Leavenworth to Fort Riley.

See also
List of rivers of Kansas

References

Rivers of Jackson County, Kansas
Rivers of Nemaha County, Kansas
Rivers of Shawnee County, Kansas
Rivers of Kansas